Neil Sutherland (19 May 1942 – 24 July 1998) was an  Australian rules footballer who played with Geelong in the Victorian Football League (VFL).

Notes

External links 

1942 births
1998 deaths
Australian rules footballers from South Australia
Geelong Football Club players